Sadik Olaniyi Balarabe (born 26 June 1992) is an English professional footballer who plays as a forward for Welling United.

Career
In 2011, Balarabe headed to America to study at Jackson College, scoring 11 goals in 12 games in his first season  and a further 19 goals in his second year. He spent two years studying at Jackson College before finishing his studies with Saginaw Valley State University, who he scored six goals in 17 games for in the 2013 season. He also played in the USL Premier Development League for Chicago Inferno, making five appearances.

In the summer of 2014, Balarabe arrived in Greece to join AO Levante before moving up divisions to join Greek Football League side Iraklis Psachna. in January 2015. He made his professional debut on 26 January, coming on as a 65th minute substitute in a 0–0 draw with Kallithea.

Ahead of the following season, Balarabe joined Gamma Ethniki side Niki Volou in July 2015.

He then joined Portuguese LigaPro side Gil Vicente on a two-year-deal in September 2016.

In January 2019, he joined KTFF Süper Lig side Mağusa Türk Gücü after spells in Turkey with Torbalispor and Salihli Belediyespor. Balarabe finished the season with 16 goals in 22 games as he helped lead his side to the league and cup double.

On 10 August 2019, Balarabe joined Tercera División side Urraca. After half  a season with Urraca, he joined fellow Tercera División side Ibiza Islas Pitiusas until the end of the season.

In October 2020, Balarabe returned to England to join National League South side Hemel Hempstead Town. He scored on his debut after coming on as a substitute in a 4–1 loss to Eastbourne Borough. The following month, he joined division rivals Dulwich Hamlet, making his debut in a 3–1 defeat against Havant & Waterlooville.

In May 2021, Balarabe joined Isthmian League side Cray Wanderers.

In September 2021, Balarabe returned to Northern Cyprus to rejoin Mağusa Türk Gücü.

In July 2022, Balarabe returned to America for the first time since completing college to join USL Championship side Birmingham Legion. Balarabe scored on his debut coming off the bench against Atlanta United 2. Following the 2022 season, Balarabe was released by Birmingham.

In March 2023, Balarabe joined National League South side Welling United on a deal until the end of the season. Later that day, he scored on his debut against Ebbsfleet United in the Kent Senior Cup.

Personal life
Balarabe attended Stationers' Crown Woods Academy in Eltham whilst growing up.

Career statistics

Honours
Mağusa Türk Gücü
KTFF Süper Lig: 2018–2019, 2021–22
Cypriot Cup: 2019, 2022
Individual
Cypriot Cup Golden Boot: 2019, 2022

References

External links

Stats at La Preferente

1992 births
Living people
English people of Nigerian descent
English footballers
Association football forwards
Footballers from Greater London
USL League Two players
Football League (Greece) players
Tercera División players
Gamma Ethniki players
Iraklis Psachna F.C. players
Niki Volos F.C. players
Gil Vicente F.C. players
CD Ibiza Islas Pitiusas players
Hemel Hempstead Town F.C. players
Cray Wanderers F.C. players
Dulwich Hamlet F.C. players
English expatriate footballers
English expatriate sportspeople in the United States
English expatriate sportspeople in Greece
English expatriate sportspeople in Portugal
English expatriate sportspeople in Turkey
English expatriate sportspeople in Northern Cyprus
English expatriate sportspeople in Spain
Expatriate soccer players in the United States
Expatriate footballers in Greece
Expatriate footballers in Portugal
Expatriate footballers in Turkey
Expatriate footballers in Northern Cyprus
Expatriate footballers in Spain
Black British sportspeople
Birmingham Legion FC players
USL Championship players
Saginaw Valley State Cardinals men's soccer players
Welling United F.C. players